Lacalma is a genus of snout moths. It was described by Anthonie Johannes Theodorus Janse in 1931.

Species
 Lacalma albirufalis (Hampson, 1916)
 Lacalma argenteorubra (Hampson, 1916)
 Lacalma ferrealis (Hampson, 1906)
 Lacalma mniomima (Turner, 1912)
 Lacalma papuensis (Warren, 1891)
 Lacalma porphyrealis (Kenrick, 1907)

References

Epipaschiinae
Pyralidae genera